The 2022–23 season was Ayr United's fifth consecutive season in the Scottish Championship after being promoted from league one in the 2017–18 season. Ayr also competed in the, League Cup, Challenge Cup and the Scottish Cup.

Summary

Season

Results and fixtures

Pre-season

Scottish Championship

Scottish League Cup

Group stage
Results

Scottish Challenge Cup

Scottish Cup

Squad statistics

Appearances

|-
|colspan="10"|Players who left the club during the 2022–23 season
|-

|}

Team statistics

League table

League Cup table

Transfers

Transfers in

Transfers out

Loans in

Loans out 

Notes

References

Ayr United F.C. seasons
Ayr